Wuhan University College of Chinese Language and Literature is a school that awards undergraduate and graduate degrees with majors related to Chinese language and literature. Established by Wuhan University in 1917, the college is categorized under the Faculty of Humanities. The dean is Xianfeng Tu. The college was ranked among the top ten in a survey conducted by the Ministry of Education of China.

History
1917, Division of Chinese was established by the National Wuchang Higher Normal College.
1922, the division was expanded into a School of Chinese.
1927, National Wuchang Zhongshan University was established based on the previous college. The School of Chinese was part of the new University.
1928, National Wuhan University was established in the same fashion. The school was renamed the College of Chinese. Yiduo Wen became the first dean.
1953, the college, later renamed back to the School of Chinese, went through mergers and readjustments due to politics.
1997, the college was re-established.
1999, merged with the Schools of History and Philosophy to become the College of Humanities. 
2003, split into three schools.

Academics
The College of Chinese offers the following majors:

Undergraduate
Chinese Language and Literature
Teaching Chinese as a Second Language
Humanities
Sinology

First Class Doctoral and Post-Doctoral
National Key Concentrations: Modern and Contemporary Chinese Literature
National Key Concentrations in Progress: Classic Chinese Literature
Provincial Key Concentrations: Chinese Language and Literature
Provincial Excellent Concentrations: Modern and Contemporary Chinese Literature
Provincial Special Concentrations: Classic Chinese Literature

First Class Doctoral and Masters
Literary Theory
Linguistics and Applied Linguistics 
Chinese Philology
Chinese Classical Bibliography
Chinese Classical Literature
Chinese Modern and Contemporary Literature
Comparative Literature and World Literature
Chinese History of Literary Criticism
Creative Writing Theory and Practice
Teaching Chinese as a Second Language
Sinology in China and Abroad 
Ancient Bibliography Collation and Research, etc.

Professional degrees
Master in Teaching Chinese as a Second Language
Master in Teaching Chinese as a First Language

Confucius Institute
The College has established a Confucius Institute with the University of Pittsburgh.

References

Wuhan University Faculty of Humanities